Ludvig Lindblom (12 January 1910 – 4 October 1985) was a Swedish wrestler. He competed at the 1932 Summer Olympics and the 1936 Summer Olympics.

References

External links
 

1910 births
1985 deaths
Swedish male sport wrestlers
Olympic wrestlers of Sweden
Wrestlers at the 1932 Summer Olympics
Wrestlers at the 1936 Summer Olympics
Sportspeople from Örebro
20th-century Swedish people